All Girl Summer Fun Band is an American, Portland based twee-pop band, initially composed of Kim Baxter, Kathy Foster, Jen Sbragia, and Ari Douangpanya.

Biography
Baxter met Sbragia after a Softies show, when Baxter gave Sbragia a tape of her music. That summer, Baxter asked each of the girls if they wanted to start an "all girl summer fun band." Although the other three hadn't met before, they all agreed, and the band was formed. After releasing an EP and several singles, they joined K Records. K released two albums for the band, an eponymous debut and the follow-up 2, before Douangpanya left the band in 2005 to raise her son. The remaining members continued as a three-piece. On September 23, 2008, the band released their third full-length album.

The members of AGSFB have played in various other bands, most notably Foster in The Thermals and Sbragia in The Softies, amongst others. The members of the band also work at Portland's Rock and Roll Camp for Girls.

Discography

Albums
All Girl Summer Fun Band (2002, K Records)
2 (2003, K Records)
Looking Into It (September 23, 2008, AGSFB Music)

EPs
Summer of '98 (2003, Magic Marker)
All Girl Summer Fun Band & Cars Can Be Blue (2009, Happy Happy Birth Day To Me Records)

Singles
"All Girl Summer Fun Band" (1999, Magic Marker)

References

Further reading

External links
Official website

 

1998 establishments in Oregon
All-female bands
American girl groups
Indie rock musical groups from Oregon
Indie pop groups from Oregon
K Records artists
Musical groups from Portland, Oregon
Musical groups established in 1998
Singers from Oregon